The  was a professional golf tournament in Japan. Founded in 1972, it was an event on the Japan Golf Tour from its inaugural season in 1973. It was held at the Asahi Country Club near Ichihara, Chiba.

Winners

References

Former Japan Golf Tour events
Defunct golf tournaments in Japan
Sport in Chiba Prefecture
Recurring sporting events established in 1972
Recurring sporting events disestablished in 1978
1972 establishments in Japan
1978 disestablishments in Japan